The B 440 is a German federal road in Lower Saxony. It runs from the district town of Rotenburg an der Wümme to Bad Fallingbostel. It was based on an old Army road built by Napoléon Bonaparte.

Course 

It begins at the B 215, runs through the so-called Mill Quarter (Mühlenviertel) of Rotenburg an der Wümme, passes nearby Bothel and after about 20 km passes through the town centre of Visselhövede to the southeast. Continuing in a southwesterly direction it crosses the Bomlitz valley north of Bomlitz. In Dorfmark (part of Bad Fallingbostel) it crosses the B 209 and joins the A 7 motorway just east of the village.

See also 
List of federal highways in Germany

440
B440